The 2022 Manchester City Council election took place on 5 May 2022. One third of councillors on Manchester City Council were elected. This election was a part of the other local elections across the United Kingdom.

In the previous council election in 2021, the Labour Party maintained its longstanding control of the council, holding 94 of the council's 96 seats. The Green Party held one of the others, and the Liberal Democrats held the other.

Background

History 
The Local Government Act 1972 created a two-tier system of metropolitan counties and districts covering Greater Manchester, Merseyside, South Yorkshire, Tyne and Wear, the West Midlands, and West Yorkshire starting in 1974. Manchester was a district of the Greater Manchester metropolitan county. The Local Government Act 1985 abolished the metropolitan counties, with metropolitan districts taking on most of their powers as metropolitan boroughs. The Greater Manchester Combined Authority was created in 2011 and began electing the mayor of Greater Manchester from 2017, which was given strategic powers covering a region coterminous with the former Greater Manchester metropolitan county.

Since its formation, Manchester City Council has continuously been under Labour control. In the most recent council election in 2021, Labour won 31 of the 32 seats up for election with 65.4% of the vote, and the Green Party won the other seat with 11.5% of the vote across the borough. The Conservatives received 10.8% of the vote and the Liberal Democrats won 10.4% of the vote but neither party won any seats.

The Local Government Boundary Commission for England produced new boundaries for Manchester ahead of the 2018 election, meaning that the 2018 elections were all-out, with all councillors being elected before returning to electing by thirds. Candidates up for re-election in 2022 are those who came first in each ward in 2018.

Council term 
On 7 September 2021 Richard Leese announced his retirement after 38 years as a councillor and 25 years as the council leader. He was succeeded as leader on 1 December 2021 by Bev Craig and resigned from the council on 4 January 2022. Two by-elections have been called since the 2021 election: One in Chorlton, held on 14 October 2021, following the resignation of Matt Strong, which was won by Mathew Benham for Labour, and one in Ancoats & Beswick, held on 3 February 2022, following the resignation of Marcia Hutchinson, which was won by Alan Good for the Liberal Democrats.  

The following councillors are not standing for re-election:

Electoral process 
The council elects its councillors in thirds, with a third being up for election every year for three years, with no election in the fourth year. Councillors are elected via first-past-the-post voting, with each ward represented by three councillors, with one elected in each election year to serve a four-year term.

All registered electors (British, Irish, Commonwealth and European Union citizens) living in Manchester aged 18 or over will be entitled to vote in the election. People who live at two addresses in different councils, such as university students with different term-time and holiday addresses, are entitled to be registered for and vote in elections in both local authorities. Voting in-person at polling stations will take place from 07:00 to 22:00 on election day, and voters will be able to apply for postal votes or proxy votes in advance of the election.

Council composition
After the 2021 election, the composition of the council was:

Immediately prior to the election, the composition of the council was:

	

After the election, the composition of the council is:

Results 
Summary change in vote share compared to the 2021 election. Change in number of seats compared to the most recent sitting councillor for each ward prior to the election.

For the per-ward results, asterisks denote incumbent Councillors seeking re-election. Unless otherwise noted, the councillors seeking re-election were elected in 2018; changes in vote share are compared to 2018.

Ancoats and Beswick

Ardwick

Baguley

Brooklands

Burnage

Charlestown

Cheetham

Chorlton

Chorlton Park

Clayton and Openshaw
Note: The incumbent councillor, Thomas Robinson, was elected in May 2021.

Crumpsall

Deansgate

Didsbury East

Didsbury West

Fallowfield
Note: The incumbent councillor, Ali Ilyas, was elected in May 2019

Gorton and Abbey Hey

Harpurhey

Higher Blackley

Hulme

Levenshulme

Longsight

Miles Platting and Newton Heath

Moss Side

Moston

Northenden

Old Moat

Piccadilly

Conservative candidate Alexander Bramham was suspended from the Conservative party on 25 April after sending tweets linking trans and black people with Nazis. As he was validly nominated as a Conservative candidate at the close of the nomination period, he appeared as "The Conservative Party Candidate" on the ballot paper.

Rusholme

Sharston

Whalley Range

Withington

Woodhouse Park

Changes since this election

On 1 July 2022 Ekua Bayunu (Hulme, elected 2021) quit the Labour party and joined the Green party.

References

Manchester City Council elections
Manchester
2020s in Manchester